The Government of Manipur (/mə.ni.pur lə́i.ŋak/), also known as the State Government of Manipur, or locally as State Government, is the supreme governing authority of the Indian state of Manipur and its 16 districts. It consists of an executive, led by the Governor of Manipur, a judiciary and a legislative branch (Manipur Legislative Assembly).

Like other states in India, the head of state of Manipur is the Governor, appointed by the President of India on the advice of the Central government. The post of governor is largely ceremonial. The Chief Minister is the head of government and is vested with most of the executive powers. Imphal is the capital of Manipur, and houses the Vidhan Sabha (Legislative Assembly) and the secretariat. The high court of manipur exercises the jurisdiction and powers in respect of cases arising in the State.

List of Ministers after 2017 Assembly elections

On 15 March 2017, Nongthombam Biren Singh took oath with 8 ministers from various parties and later it is expanded by adding 4 new ministers.

See also 

 N. Biren Singh ministry

References